Mendon Airport was an airfield operational in the mid-20th century in Mendon, Massachusetts.

References

Defunct airports in Massachusetts
Mendon, Massachusetts
Airports in Worcester County, Massachusetts